Hartwolf "Lucki" Stipetić (also Lucki Herzog) is a German film producer, and the younger half brother of filmmaker Werner Herzog. Stipetić is the official head of Werner Herzog Filmproduktion, the production company which has produced almost all of Herzog's films.

Awards 
 1987 Bavarian Film Awards, Best Producer Wayback Machine

References

External links 
 

Living people
Year of birth missing (living people)